Anupam Saikia is an Indian mathematician and at present professor in the Department of Mathematics at IIT Guwahati, India. He is known for his work related to arithmetic number theory, in particular applications to Iwasawa Theory and p-adic measures. He has also published articles in mathematical cryptography.

Biography 

Saikia qualified his school leaving examinations from Govt. Higher Secondary School, Golaghat, Assam, in 1989. Then, he did his pre-university studies at Cotton College, Guwahati until 1991 and joined St. Stephen's College, Delhi for his Bachelors in Mathematics. After his B.Sc. degree in 1994, he joined Trinity College, Cambridge and became a wrangler in 1996. He completed his Certificate for Advanced Study in Mathematics (Mathematical Tripos, Part III) at Trinity College in 1997 with distinction, and then pursued his PhD degree from the Department of Pure Mathematics and Mathematical Statistics, University of Cambridge, which he received in 2001 for a thesis titled Iwasawa Theory of Lubin-Tate Division Towers and p-Adic L-Functions under the supervision of John Coates.

Since his PhD, Saikia has held post doctoral positions at several institutes, including IHES, France and McGill University, Canada. Following a brief period of time at IIT, Bombay, Saikia has been a member of the faculty at IIT, Guwahati since 2005, becoming full professor in 2015. At various times, he has held several administrative positions in IIT, Guwahati as well.

Saikia is also a keen sportsperson and was captain of the Trinity College Badminton team in 1999-99, as well as member of its cricket team. He is also an enthusiastic chess and carom player. He lives in Guwahati with his wife and children.

Awards and honours 

Saikia has won several awards and scholarships during his career. He won the Ramanujan Scholarship to pursue his studies at Cambridge, given to one Indian student each year. He was awarded the Smith and Knight Prize in the annual mathematics essay competition for second year Ph.D. students at the University of Cambridge in 1999 and the Senior Rouseball Scholarship, awarded by Trinity College, Cambridge on the basis of postgraduate research work in 2000-2001.

Professional Contributions 

Saikia has written several research papers so far related to Iwasawa Theory, p-adic measures, Cyclotomic fields and Euler Systems. He has so far guided 6 students under him for their Ph.D dissertation. He is also associated with giving several popular lectures for school and college students in different places of Assam as well as in other parts of the country. He has also edited two volumes of conference proceedings related to Wiles' Proof of the Iwasawa's Main Conjecture and Bloch-Kato Conjectures.

He is the editor-in-chief of Journal of the Assam Academy of Mathematics  and a member of the editorial boards of the Journal of the Ramanujan Mathematical Society and the Bulletin of the Mathematics Teachers' Association (India).

References

External links
Personal Homepage
Interview in Assamese

Academic staff of the Indian Institute of Technology Guwahati
21st-century Indian mathematicians
Living people
Indian Institutes of Technology people
Indian number theorists
Assamese people
Year of birth missing (living people)